John G. Cowell (18 September 1785 – 18 April 1814) was an officer in the United States Navy during the War of 1812.

Born in Marblehead, Massachusetts, Cowell entered the Navy as a master 21 January 1809. As acting lieutenant, Cowell was severely wounded, losing a leg, in the action on 28 March 1814 between USS Essex and HMS Phoebe and HMS Cherub off Valparaíso, Chile. Refusing to be carried below, Cowell cheered his companions on through the remainder of the action. He was carried on shore, and exhibited such gallantry and courage under severe pain until his death on 18 April that the people of Valparaíso honored him with a burial place in their principal church; a most unusual honor for a foreigner.

Two destroyers have been named USS Cowell for him.

1785 births
1814 deaths
American amputees
American military personnel killed in the War of 1812
Military personnel from Massachusetts
People from Marblehead, Massachusetts
People from Massachusetts in the War of 1812
United States Navy officers
United States Navy personnel of the War of 1812